In English law, unlawful killing is a verdict that can be returned by an inquest in England and Wales when someone has been killed by one or more unknown persons. The verdict means that the killing was done without lawful excuse and in breach of criminal law. This includes murder, manslaughter, infanticide and causing death by dangerous driving.  A verdict of unlawful killing generally leads to a police investigation, with the aim of gathering sufficient evidence to identify, charge and prosecute those responsible.

The inquest does not normally name any individual person as responsible. In R (on the application of Maughan) v Her Majesty's Senior Coroner for Oxfordshire the Supreme Court clarified that the standard of proof for suicide and unlawful killing in an inquest is the civil standard of the balance of probabilities and not the criminal standard of beyond reasonable doubt.

Notable cases
Lt Col Rupert Thorneloe and Trooper Joshua Hammond, of the 2nd Royal Tank Regiment, were killed in an explosion in Helmand Province in Afghanistan on 1 July 2009.
Ian Tomlinson, who was struck with a baton and pushed to the ground by Metropolitan Police officer Simon Harwood at the G20 protests in London on 1 April 2009.
 Diana, Princess of Wales died in a car crash in Paris on 31 August 1997. The initial French inquiry in 1999 concluded the crash was caused by the driver's loss of control while drunk; a verdict of unlawful killing was returned in a British inquest in 2008.
 Father David Paget, vicar of St. Andrew's Church, Fulham, stabbed to death at his home by David Watkins, a drunkard with a history of mental problems, in 2001.
 Trooper Matty Hull, killed in a US friendly fire incident in 2003.
 Terry Lloyd, ITN journalist, who was fired on by United States tanks near Basra on 22 March 2003.
 Iain Hook, UNRWA worker, shot by an Israeli sniper in Jenin in 2002.
 Tom Hurndall, shot by an Israeli sniper in the Gaza Strip in 2003.
 The fifty-two victims of the 7 July 2005 London bombings were declared on 6 May 2011 to have been unlawfully killed.
 Ronald Maddison, an airman who died whilst acting as an experimental subject in chemical weapons testing in 1953. A verdict of unlawful killing was returned in a 2004 inquest; the original 1953 inquest had returned a verdict of misadventure.
 David Gray, a patient in his home in Cambridgeshire, was unlawfully killed by lethal injection administered by out-of-hours locum doctor Daniel Ubani on 16 February 2008.
The death of 97 Liverpool F.C. fans in the Hillsborough disaster on 15 April 1989, with the ruling returned at a second inquest in April 2016: A previous inquest in 1991 had returned a verdict of accidental death.
2019 London Bridge stabbing: In May 2021, a jury ruled that failings by MI5 and the police contributed to the deaths of Saskia Jones and Jack Merritt, two young graduates who were unlawfully killed by a convicted terrorist.

References

External links
 Law Sheet No. 1 - Unlawful Killing at www.judiciary.uk

Homicide
English law